Intraflagellar transport protein 81 homolog is a protein that in humans is encoded by the IFT81 gene. Together with IFT74/72 it forms a core complex to build IFT particles which are required for cilium formation. Additionally, it interacts with basal body components as CEP170 which regulates the disassembly of the cilium.

References

Further reading